Lanka is the name given in Hindu epics to the island fortress capital of the legendary demon king Ravana.

Lanka may also refer to:

 Lanka, Assam, a town in Assam, India
 Laṅkāvatāra Sūtra, scripture in Mahāyāna Buddhism
 Sri Lanka, an island nation south of India
 Lanka (2006 film), Indian Malayalam-language crime-thriller film
 Lanka (2011 film), Indian drama-thriller film
 Lanka (2017 film), Indian Telugu-language film
 Stefan Lanka (Bardens vs. Lanka, Regional Court Stuttgart, 2016)